Bethel African Methodist Episcopal Church is a church in Morristown, New Jersey. 

It is the first black congregation in Morris County, incorporated in 1843 by the Bethel Mite Society, which raised funds to construct the 1849 Carpenter Gothic church on Spring Street. The current building was dedicated in 1970.

History
Prior to 1843 – As members of "The Bethel Mite Society", worshippers met at various locations in Morristown –  including a small house on High Street, a carpentry shop on Speedwell Avenue, a blacksmith shop on Morris Street, and a house at 34 Spring Street.
December 18, 1843 – Certificate of Incorporation as “The African Methodist Episcopal Church of Morristown.”
1844 – William Sayre, Jr. conveyed to the church corporation a parcel of property on the west side of Spring Street.
1845 – Willis Nazery served as Bethel's first pastor of record.  He was born a slave in 1803 in Isle of Wight County in Virginia. After ordination as an A.M.E. Bishop on May 13, 1852 in New York City, Bishop Nazery was sent to Canada to found congregations. He is recognized as an Underground Railroad conductor.  He became the first Bishop of the new British Methodist Episcopal Church, which was organized by freedmen and fugitive slaves. 
1849 – Bethel's first church building was completed and dedicated with Bishop Paul Quinn officiating, assisted by pastor, Rev. Thomas Oliver.
September 28, 1859 – New Certificate of Incorporation as a result of reorganization of the church as “The African Methodist Episcopal Bethel Church of Morristown.”
July 29, 1874 – A deed is recorded showing the purchase, from John R. and Cornelia Piper, of a 70 ft x 160 ft lot on the east side of Spring Street for the sum of $2000.  
1874 –According to Bethel’s church history:  “Trustees proposed and built a church 34ft x 50ft at an estimated cost of $3000.  Gifts from Mrs. George T. (Mary Anne) Cobb of pews, doors and windows from the old Methodist Church [on the Morristown Green] helped in this great work.” [Existing house on the lot was moved next door and used as a parsonage].
1876 – New church as well as property on west side of Spring Street lost in Sheriff’s Sale June 12, 1876.  Present property purchased by George L. Hull, who on September 7, 1878 conveyed it to the Young Men’s Christian Association (YMCA) of Morristown, NJ.
July 1, 1943 – At a meeting called for the purpose, the name of the corporation was changed to Bethel African Methodist Episcopal Church, Morristown, NJ.  On July 28, 1943 the present property was conveyed to the new church corporation by deed from the YMCA, Morristown, NJ.
July 28, 1943 – Present property conveyed to the church corporation by the YMCA.
December 12–19, 1943 – Bethel celebrated its “One Hundredth Anniversary.”  Rev. Alexander White - Pastor, Rev. L.J.B. Bell - Presiding Elder, and Rt. Rev. David H. Sims - Presiding Bishop, officiated.
1947 – A mortgage burning celebration is held under the pastorate of Rev. Alexander White.  In 1948 the Urban League of Morris County was formed, with Rev. White serving as its first president and Mrs. Genevieve Steele, a Bethel steward, serving as treasurer.
1956 - 68 – During the 12 year pastorate of Rev. Samuel S. Singleton, a building fund of $45,000 was raised toward the construction a new church.
August 12, 1967 – Under leadership of the pastor, Rev. A. Lewis Williams, groundbreaking ceremony is held for new church.
1968–1970 – The congregation worshipped in the Lafayette School auditorium for two and one half years until the construction of the church was completed. 
November 8, 1970 – After numerous setbacks and financial difficulties, the present church was completed and dedicated. Rev. A. Lewis Williams subsequently served as the Editor of The Christian Recorder from 1973-1976.
December 19, 1987 – Under the pastorate of Rev. Clarence B. Crawford, a mortgage burning celebration is held with Presiding Elder Rev. Bynum C. Burton and Presiding Bishop Rt. Rev. Frank C. Cummings also officiating.
1992 – Under leadership of the pastor, Rev. Joseph Whalen, Sr., renovation of our parsonage at 39 Hillairy Avenue was undertaken.  The project was completed in April 1993 and the parsonage was dedicated July 1993 by pastor, Rev. Harvey H. B. Sparkman, III.
1999 – Bethel ANGELS HIV/AIDS Ministry established under the leadership of the pastor, Rev. Harvey H. B. Sparkman, III.
2001 – Under the leadership of the pastorate of Rev. Louis Attles, an elevator was installed and several renovations were made to make the church handicap accessible.
2005- 10 – Under the pastorate of Rev. Alfonso Sherald, Bethel’s facilities were used for Sunday afternoon worship services, as well as other weekly gatherings and meetings, by a local Latino Christian congregation. Rev. Sherald also served as president of the Morris County Branch of the NAACP and as chaplain at the Youth Guidance Center of Morris County. 
November 10, 2010 – The Rev. Sidney S. Williams, Jr. was appointed as the 51st Pastor of Bethel. In addition to installing the congregations first Baptismal Pool, there have been many other accomplishments. Under the leadership of Pastor Williams the street name adjacent to the church was changed from Center Street to Bishop Nazery Way; the Congregation embarked on its first missions trip outside the US, spending a week in the Dominican Republic; the Congregation launched its Community Development Center - the Spring Street CDC.
August 28, 2011 –The church sustained extensive water damage from Hurricane Irene.  Members, local churches and many volunteers contributed countless hours of work before Sunday worship services resumed at Bethel October 9, 2011.

References

External links

Morristown, New Jersey
African Methodist Episcopal churches in New Jersey
Churches completed in 1970
Religious organizations established in 1843
1843 establishments in New Jersey